Superette were a New Zealand indie rock band, who were signed by Flying Nun Records.

History
The band was formed in 1993 in Auckland, New Zealand by members of the Jean-Paul Sartre Experience and Fang: Ben Howe, Dave Mulcahy, and Greta Anderson. The band's first release was the Rosepig EP, released in 1994. "Killer Clown" from the EP was released as a single in 1995. In 1996, the band's only album, Tiger was released, as well as a single taken from it, "Touch Me".

The band were often compared to Pixies, as well as Mulcahy's former band, the Jean-Paul Sartre Experience.

After the band split up, Howe went on to start the record label Arch Hill Recordings. Mulcahy released a solo album, Oddy Knocky, in 1999, and went on to record two albums with the band Kimo, and later fronted several other bands. 

The band reunited in 2003 for a live show, and again in 2006 for a performance to celebrate the tenth anniversary of Tigers release.

Tiger was reissued in expanded form in 2018, included songs recorded as demos for a proposed second album.

Discography

Albums
Tiger (1996 - Flying Nun Records - FN352)

EP
Rosepig (1994 - Flying Nun Records - FNCD326)

Singles
"Killer Clown" (1995 - 7" - Flying Nun Records – FN326)
"Touch Me" (1996 - CD Maxi-Single - Festival Records – D 1280)
"Touch Me" / "Anything" (1996 - 7" - Flying Nun Records – FN362)

Compilation appearances
The group have appeared on some compilations.
The following is a list of these albums that have featured tracks by the Superette.

15 (1995 - Flying Nun Records - FNCD377)
The Sound Is Out There (1995 - Flying Nun Records – FNCD334, Festival Records - D 1168)
Abbasalutely (1995 - Flying Nun Records - FN315)
Pop Eyed (1996 - Flying Nun Records - FNCD395)
Topless Women Talk About Their Lives (1997 - Flying Nun Records - FNCD402)
How Much For Trade? (1998 - Flying Nun Records - TRADEME1)
Flying Nun 25th Anniversary Box Set (2006 - Flying Nun Records - FNCD500)

References

Flying Nun Records artists
New Zealand indie rock groups
Dunedin Sound musical groups